is a Prefectural Natural Park in eastern Saga Prefecture, Japan. Established in 1975, the park spans the municipalities of Kanzaki and Saga.

See also
 National Parks of Japan

References

Parks and gardens in Saga Prefecture
Protected areas established in 1975
1975 establishments in Japan